Eric Jagers (born May 28, 1995) is an American professional baseball coach and former pitcher. He was the assistant pitching coach for the Cincinnati Reds of Major League Baseball (MLB) from 2021 to 2022.

Career 
Jagers attended and played baseball at Des Moines Area Community College before earning a roster spot on University of Iowa baseball team. However, he did not play for Iowa as he retired due to developing thoracic outlet syndrome and instead opted to work at Driveline Baseball in Seattle, where he had previously trained and developed his pitching abilities that helped earn him a roster spot at Iowa. He left Driveline to be a pitching strategist for the Philadelphia Phillies in 2019 before joining the Cincinnati Reds organization before the start of the 2020 season as their minor league pitching coordinator. He was promoted to assistant pitching coach in 2021 after Caleb Cotham left to be the Phillies' pitching coach.

References

External links 
 

1995 births
Living people
People from Bettendorf, Iowa
Baseball players from Iowa
Baseball coaches from Iowa
Cincinnati Reds coaches
Indian Hills Falcons baseball players